Gilbert Morgan Smith (6 January 1885, Beloit, Wisconsin – 11 July 1959) was a botanist and phycologist, who worked primarily on the algae. He was best known for his books, particularly the Freshwater Algae of the United States, the Marine Algae of the Monterey Peninsula and the two volumes of Cryptogamic Botany.

Career 
Smith was born on 6 January 1885 to Elizabeth Mayher Smith and Erastus G. Smith in Beloit, Wisconsin, where his father was Professor of Chemistry at the College. His parents were both born in Massachusetts and educated there, at Mt. Holyoke College and Amherst College respectively. Smith attended Beloit College, where he concentrated on botany and chemistry, and graduated in 1907. He taught science at the high school in Stoughton, Wisconsin for the next two years, before beginning graduate studies at the University of Wisconsin in 1909, where he started work on the algal genus Oedogonium. He interrupted his studies for a one-year teaching appointment at Pomona College in 1910-1911. In 1913 he completed his PhD and also married Helen Pfuderer. He remained in the Botany Department at Wisconsin, where he continued to work on algae, especially desmids, eventually reaching the position of associate professor. He was invited to Stanford University for 1923-1924, and in 1925 became Professor of Botany there. In 1924 he wrote together with his colleagues a botany textbook, A textbook of general botany, which gives a broad introduction to the various elements and concepts of general botany. In 1950 he became Emeritus Professor, but remained scientifically active until his death on 11 July 1959.

Eponymy 
Several species and genera of algae have been named in honor of Gilbert M. Smith:

 Gilbertsmithia M.O.P. Iyengar 
 Smithiella B.P. Skvortsov
 Smithimastix B.P. Skvortsov
 Smithora G.J. Hollenberg
 Hymenena smithii Kylin
 Gymnogongrus smithii Taylor
 Pseudostaurastrum smithii Bourrelly
 Chlamydomonas smithiana Pascher
 Dactylococcopsis smithii R. & F. Chodat
 Tetradesmus smithii Prescott
 Debarya smithii Transeau
 Gloeochloris smithiana Pascher
 Polysiphonia flaccidissima var. smithii Hollenberg

See also 
 Gilbert Morgan Smith Medal
 Smith system, his taxonomic system (published in Cryptogamic Botany)

References

External links 
 G. M. Smith (1938). Cryptogamic Botany, vol. 1. McGraw-Hill, New York.
 G. M. Smith (1955). Cryptogamic Botany, vol. 2. McGraw-Hill, New York. 2nd ed.

American botanists
Beloit College alumni
1885 births
1959 deaths
People from Beloit, Wisconsin
American phycologists
Stanford University faculty
Pomona College faculty